Peerspace is a peer-to-peer marketplace for booking space for events, meetings and productions. Launched in February 2014, Peerspace is a privately owned company operating in the San Francisco Bay Area, Los Angeles, New York, Chicago, Austin, Seattle and Washington D.C.

History
Peerspace was founded in 2014 by Rony Chammas and Matt Bendett. Chammas has said that the idea for the company came to him while he was attending New York University trying to find places to meet up with various groups or clubs. Chammas, chief executive officer, and Bendett, head of marketing and acquisitions, met while working together at Electronic Arts (EA).

In September 2014, Peerspace announced that it had raised $1.5 million in its first round of venture capital funding. The funding round was led by Structure Capital and the funds were used to expand the Peerspace operations outside of San Francisco.

In January 2018, the company announced former Ancestry and eBay executive Eric Shoup as its chief executive officer. Peerspace raised a $16 million Series B funding round, led by GV, in July 2018.

Operations
Peerspace operates a website and mobile app that allow businesses to rent out their location or office to other businesses or individuals. The company provides a marketplace for locations that can be used for various professional and social purposes such as offices, culinary activities, fitness, studios, events, production, performances, and classes.

Host spaces listed on Peerspace are zoned for commercial use and bookings are issued as licenses to use creative spaces for a wide range of purposes. The users can rent spaces for short periods of time, which are billed by the hour. Peerspace makes a profit by taking a percent of the transaction from the host and the renter.

References

Internet properties established in 2014
Companies based in San Francisco